Local elections were held in Iligan City on May 9, 2022, as part of the Philippine general election. Registered voters elected officials for the local posts in the city: the mayor, vice mayor, one congressman, and twelve councilors.

By the end of filing of certificates of candidacy last October 8, 2021, a total of 2 hopefuls filed their COCs for congressman, 7 for city mayor, 4 for vice-mayor, and 49 for city councilors.

On May 10, 2022, a new set of mayor, vice-mayor, congressman, councilors were declared winners by the city board of canvassers at the session hall of the Sangguniang Panlungsod. A total of 154,734 cast their votes (from 263 total election returns) out of 185,452 eligible voters in the city for this election, giving a voter turnout of 83.44%, an increase of 10.89% from last 2019 election's turnout of 72.55%.

Mayoral election
Celso Regencia (PDP–Laban) is the incumbent but term-limited. He ran for congressman of the city. Incumbent vice-mayor Jemar Vera Cruz  was the ruling party's official nominee against incumbent congressman Frederick Siao. Siao announced his candidacy under Nacionalista Party allied with Hugpong ng Pagbabago (HNP) banner. Siao became the newly elected city mayor and won via landslide.

Vice mayoral election
Jemar Vera Cruz (PDP–Laban) was the incumbent and on his second term. The ruling party nominated him for city mayor instead while nominating incumbent councilor Ian Uy for vice-mayor against businessman and former mayoral aspirant Marianito Alemania (Nacionalista Party). Alemania won with a slim margin over Uy.

Congressional election 
Frederick Siao was the incumbent and only on his second term. However, he chose to run for City Mayor, nominating former congressman Vicente "Varf" Belmonte Jr. (NUP) to run instead against incumbent mayor Celso Regencia (PDP–Laban).

City council election

Parties are as stated in their certificates of candidacy. 

|bgcolor=black colspan=5|

Candidates per Coalition

Partido Demokratiko Pilipino-Lakas ng Bayan (Team RVU 15-0)

Nacionalista Party (Team BSA Solid 15)

PROMDI (Tatak Iliganon)

Partido para sa Demokratikong Reporma (Alyansa Sa Bag-Ong Iligan)

Independents

References

External links
COMELEC - Official website of the Philippine Commission on Elections (COMELEC)
NAMFREL - Official website of National Movement for Free Elections (NAMFREL)
PPCRV - Official website of the Parish Pastoral Council for Responsible Voting (PPCRV)

2022 Philippine local elections
Politics of Iligan
May 2022 events in the Philippines